Louis Arnold Jacoby (born September 6, 1942) is a Norwegian singer and writer from Larvik. Jacoby grew up in Larvik's Torstrand district but has lived in Ula for many years. He is the son of the writer Arnold Jacoby (1913–2002).

Jacoby has won the Prøysen Award and the Herman Wildenvey Poetry Award, and he was named "Beer Dog of the Year" by the Norwegian Brewery Association in 1990. His best-known song "Hverdag" (Everyday) has been named one of Norway's national songs. Jacoby won the summer song competition held by the Nitimen program in 1995 (together with Lars Martin Myhre) for the song "En sommer er aldri over" (A Summer Is Never Over). Jacoby has published Den store ølviseboka (The Big Book of Beer Songs) and released several albums, including Hverdag (Everyday) and Noen & ingen (Some & None). From 1994 to 1999 he was essentially the in-house poet for the TVNorge's talk show Wesenstund. For several weeks he held a place on the musical hit list Norsktoppen with the song "Vise ved vindens enger" (A Ballad by the Wind's Meadow). The album Noen & ingen was on Norsktoppen for ten weeks in 2003, including two weeks in first place. In 2008 Jacoby released the CD Puslespill (Jigsaw Puzzle). In 2013 he released the CD Måneskinn (Moonshine). In the fall of 2016 he published a skerry calendar with photos of skerries accompanied by QR codes linking to accompanying songs and videos. He has participated in several in summer and Christmas tours with Lars Martin Myhre.

Jacoby is also a writer and has published the causerie books Min erotiske hund (My Erotic Dog), Min beduggede vinklubb (My Drunken Wine Club), Om å spise østers (About Eating Oysters), and Den muntre venteværelseboka (The Cheerful Waiting Room Book).

Poetry Park
Louis Jacoby was behind the initiative for Larvik's Poetry Park project, which envisioned poems and songs carved in larvikite located around the town of Larvik. The poetry plaques on larvikite are mounted on buildings, walls, and rock faces to form a route through the town, planned from the town center down to Fritzøe Brygge and Hammerdalen, along the seafront to Tollerodden, and out to a possible new ferry at Revet. The goal was to install 100 plaques by 2012. The project received unanimous support in Larvik's town council. The Norway Arts Council initially allocated NOK 150,000 for the Larvik Poetry Park after the application was handled by its literature committee.

Discography

Songs featuring Louis Jacoby are also found on the following albums

References

External links
Louis Jacoby's website

1952 births
Living people
20th-century Norwegian male singers
20th-century Norwegian singers
21st-century Norwegian male singers
Musicians from Larvik
Norwegian male writers